Srishti Manipal Institute of Art, Design and Technology, (Srishti), was a  premier multi-disciplinary approach design school established in 1996 by Dr. Geetha Narayanan under the Ujwal Trust in Bangalore, India. It had offered design education in Digital Video Production, Film, Visual Communication, Experimental Media Arts, Design in Education, Textile Design, Animation and Visual Effects, Interaction Design, Product and Interface Design, and Business Systems and Design.

Approach 
Srishti had a number of centers and labs that offer practice- and research-based environments for students and faculty from a multitude of disciplines.  Srishti's culture encourages thinking, questioning and experimenting to harness the artistic and intellectual potential of each individual and place the institution at the leading edge of contemporary art and design discourse.  A multi-disciplinary approach inculcates self-initiated learning and independent thinking and expands perceptual perspectives. Regular interaction with design studios, production and distribution centers, community projects, retail establishments and industry forms a vital bridge between Srishti and the world.

Notable projects 
 Blank Noise.
 The JALDI Innovation Lab, Vidhi, in collaboration with Srishti, brought out a report that addresses infrastructural and accessibility issues in courts and tribunals.

Notable alumni 
The Srishti community of learners consists of a diverse set of artists, designers, practitioners and educators from around the world, many of whom are acknowledged leaders in their respective fields.
 Jasmeen Patheja
Shilo Shiv Suleman trained in animation and graduated in 2011 as class valedictorian.

References

External links 
 
 Re-imagining consumer forums - Full report
 Srishti School Of Art, Design & ... vs The Chairperson, Central Board Of ... on 9 March, 2011

Colleges in Bangalore
Art schools in India
Design schools in India
Educational institutions established in 1996
1996 establishments in Karnataka